Taia naticoides is a species of a freshwater snail with an operculum and a gill. It is an aquatic gastropod mollusk in the family Viviparidae - commonly known as river snails.

Human use
It is used as a freshwater aquarium pet.

References

External links

 http://www.bagniliggia.it/WMSD/HtmSpecies/1071200220.htm

Viviparidae